Emperor Mingyuan of Northern Wei ((北)魏明元帝) (392 – 24 December 423), Chinese name Tuoba Si (拓拔嗣), Xianbei name Mumo (木末), was an emperor of the Xianbei-led Northern Wei dynasty of China. He was the oldest son of the founding emperor Emperor Daowu. During his reign, Northern Wei's territory did not expand as much as it did under either his father's reign or the reign of his son Emperor Taiwu, but he helped the state stabilize over northern China, and started the tradition of meeting with important imperial officials to listen to their advice and make final decisions. He is generally regarded by historians to be an intelligent and rational ruler.

Early life
Tuoba Si was born in 392 after his father Tuoba Gui had founded Northern Wei in 386 but before he had conquered most of rival Later Yan's territory and claimed imperial title in 399. His mother was Tuoba Gui's favorite consort, Consort Liu, the daughter of the Xiongnu chief Liu Toujuan (劉頭眷). He was born at the capital Yunzhong (雲中, in modern Hohhot, Inner Mongolia.) He was Tuoba Gui's oldest son, and his father was said to be so pleased by this late arrival of a son that he declared a general pardon. (Based on Northern Wei's official history, Tuoba Gui would only be 21 at this point; this might be further evidence corroborating the alternative version of his life history.)

As Tuoba Si grew, he was said to be a wise and kind young man, whose actions were all in accordance with proper protocol. In contrast, his oldest younger brother Tuoba Shao (拓拔紹) was a frivolous and violent young man, and often received punishment from Emperor Daowu, and Tuoba Si tried to correct his brother's behavior by rebukes, but this made Tuoba Shao angry at him. In 403, Tuoba Gui, by this point emperor (as Emperor Daowu), created him the Prince of Qi. In 409, Emperor Daowu was intent on creating Tuoba Si crown prince, but based on the Tuoba tradition that when an heir is decided upon, his mother must be put to death, Emperor Daowu forced Consort Liu to commit suicide. Either before or after he did so, he summoned Tuoba Si to explain to him that this tradition was also in accordance with Emperor Wu of Han's rationale to put his favorite concubine, Consort Zhao (Emperor Zhao of Han's mother) to death, to avoid overly great maternal influence on a young emperor. After Tuoba Si left his father's presence, because of the affection that he had for his mother, he mourned greatly. Hearing this, Emperor Daowu summoned him back to the palace—and, because Emperor Daowu, in his late reign, often displayed great paranoid and violent tendencies, the new crown prince's attendants suggested that he not go to the palace but hide in the country. Tuoba Si agreed and did so, fleeing the capital Pingcheng, where Emperor Daowu had moved the capital in 398.

Meanwhile, Emperor Daowu had, because of Tuoba Shao's crimes, imprisoned Tuoba Shao's mother Consort Helan and planned to execute her. Consort Helan sent her son a message, asking him to save her. In response, Tuoba Shao assassinated Emperor Daowu and then tried to take over as emperor, and he tried to seize the troops. Tuoba Si, upon hearing this news, returned to Pingcheng but hid himself, while trying to gather supporters gradually. Tuoba Shao tried to seek him out to kill him, but the imperial guards gradually shifted to Tuoba Si's side, and the imperial guards arrested Tuoba Shao and presented him to Tuoba Si. Tuoba Si executed Tuoba Shao, Consort Helan, and Tuoba Shao's associates. He then took the throne as Emperor Mingyuan.

Early reign
Emperor Mingyuan, contrary to his father's dictatorial style, instituted a council of eight officials to advise him on all important decisions, with the intent to hear different opinions and then take informed actions. The council mostly constituted of ethnic Xianbei from his tribe, but also included Han and other ethnicities. This became a tradition that was followed by his descendants as well. However, while he was known as being much more lenient than his father, he also did not tolerate wrongdoing on his advisors' part. For example, in 413, one of his key advisors, Tuoba Qu (拓拔屈) the Marquess of Yuancheng, suffered a major defeat at the hands of Xia forces, and then, once demoted to governorship of Bing Province (并州, modern central and southern Shanxi), failed to carry out his task competently, and Emperor Mingyuan executed him.

In 410, Emperor Mingyuan sent one of his advisors, Baba Song (拔拔嵩) the Duke of Nanping to attack the Rouran, and when Baba was surrounded by Rouran troops, Emperor Mingyuan personally led an army to relieve Baba. For the next years, he often left the capital Pingcheng to examine the defenses on the northern and eastern fronts (with Rouran and Northern Yan), to make sure that his state would be properly defended against enemies. He also often sent armies to pacify rebelling tribes.

Middle reign
In 414, Emperor Mingyuan sent ambassadors to Later Qin, Northern Yan, Jin, and Rouran, to try to establish peaceful relationships. The Later Qin and Jin missions were apparently largely successful, but his ambassador Huniuyu Shimen (忽忸于什門) had a conflict with the Northern Yan emperor Feng Ba over Feng Ba's insistence that Huniuyu kneel to him, and Feng Ba detained Huniuyu and refused to establish relations with Northern Wei. How successful the Rouran mission was is harder to gauge, for although initially it appeared to be successful, by new year 415 the Rouran Khan Yujiulü Datan (郁久閭大檀) invaded, and Emperor Mingyuan was forced to respond, chasing Yujiulü Datan back to his territory, but when Emperor Mingyuan sent his advisor Daxi Jin (達奚斤) to pursue Yujiulü Datan, the Northern Wei forces ran into severe weather and suffered many casualties based on frostbite. This would start a theme that would last for centuries—often, Rouran would attack, and Northern Wei would counter-attack successfully, but then become unable to have decisive victories over Rouran.

Late in 414, Emperor Mingyuan began to have his official Cui Hao (the son of his key advisor Cui Hong (崔宏)) teach him the ancient texts of I Ching and Hong Fan (洪範) – both mystical texts. He also often asked Cui Hao to make predictions based on those texts, which often came true. Cui Hao therefore became increasingly trusted and consulted by Emperor Mingyuan for important decisions.

In 415, the northern regions of Northern Wei suffered a major famine, causing Emperor Mingyuan to consider moving the capital southward to Yecheng (鄴城, in modern Handan, Hebei), but at the advice of Cui Hao and the official Zhou Dan (周澹), who believed that such a move would quickly expose the actual numerical inferiority of the Xianbei to the Han, he kept the capital at Pingcheng, but also pursuant to Cui and Zhou's suggestion, moved a number of impoverished Xianbei to the modern Hebei region.

In winter 415, pursuant to a peace agreement they had reached earlier, Later Qin's emperor Yao Xing sent his daughter the Princess Xiping to Northern Wei to be married to Emperor Mingyuan. He welcomed her with ceremony fitting an empress. However, Tuoba customs dictated that only a consort who was able to craft a gold statue by her hands could be empress, and Princess Xiping was unable to, so Emperor Mingyuan only created her an imperial consort, but within the palace honored her as wife and empress.

In 416, the Jin general Liu Yu launched a major attack on Later Qin, intending to destroy it. As part of Liu Yu's force, a fleet commanded by the general Wang Zhongde (王仲德), approached Northern Wei's only main outpost south of the Yellow River, Huatai (滑台, in modern Anyang, Henan), the Northern Wei general Yuchi Jian (尉遲建), apprehensive of the Jin forces, abandoned Huatai and fled back north of the Yellow River. Emperor Mingyuan executed Yuchi and then sent messengers to rebuke Liu Yu and Wang Zhongde, both of whom restated that the target was Later Qin, not Northern Wei, and that the city would be returned as soon as the campaign was over. (However, Jin did not actually return Huatai, and Northern Wei would not have a major presence south of the Yellow River again until 422.)

Jin forces quickly captured Later Qin's major city Luoyang and then headed toward the Later Qin capital Chang'an. In spring 417, The Later Qin emperor Yao Hong (Yao Xing's son) requested emergency assistance. Emperor Mingyuan summoned his council to consider whether to launch armies to try to stop Jin advances to try to save Later Qin. Most of his advisors, apprehensive at whether Liu Yu actually intended to attack Northern Wei as well, suggested that Emperor Mingyuan try to intercept Liu Yu's forces. However, Cui Hao opined that this would precisely make Northern Wei the target of Jin attacks, and Emperor Mingyuan partially agreed, but still sent some 100,000 men, commanded by Baba Song, to guard the northern bank of the Yellow River to prepare for battle. If a Jin ship were blown by the wind to the northern bank, Northern Wei forces would seize the ship and kill or capture its crew, and when Jin forces then landed on the northern banks, Northern Wei forces would temporarily retreat, and then re-establish the northern bank defensive posture as soon as Jin forces reboarded their ships. Angry at this harassment, Liu Yu sent his general Ding Wu (丁旿) to land on the northern bank and deal Northern Wei forces a major defeat. This ended Emperor Mingyuan's attempts to save Later Qin, and there were no further Jin/Northern Wei battles throughout the campaign, as while Emperor Mingyuan still planned to cut off Liu Yu's path if he were stopped by Later Qin forces, Liu Yu was able to capture Chang'an and destroy Later Qin by fall 417, and Emperor Mingyuan's planned attacks never materialized. Many former Jin officials who opposed Liu Yu who had taken refuge with Later Qin fled to Northern Wei, and Emperor Mingyuan further ordered that anyone who could save and deliver members of the Yao imperial clan to Pingcheng would be greatly rewarded. (How effectively this order was is not known, and most members of the Yao clan were captured and killed by Liu Yu.)

Late reign
In 418, Emperor Mingyuan launched a major attack on Northern Yan and put the Northern Yan capital Helong (和龍, in modern Jinzhou, Liaoning) under siege, but was unable to capture Helong and forced to retreat.

In 420, Emperor Mingyuan's wife Consort Yao died, and he posthumously honored her as an empress.

In 422, Emperor Mingyuan suffered a major illness, apparently caused by medicines that alchemists had given him that were supposedly capable of extending lifespans. He consulted Cui Hao on what he should do to prepare for events after his death. Cui Hao predicted that he would recover, but advised him to create his oldest son, 14-year-old Tuoba Tao the Prince of Taiping, crown prince, and then transfer some of the authorities to the crown prince so that his own burdens could be lessened. Baba Song also agreed, and Emperor Mingyuan created Tuoba Tao crown prince, and further had Crown Prince Tao take the throne to serve as the secondary emperor. He commissioned his key advisors Baba, Cui, Daxi Jin, Anchi Tong (安遲同), Qiumuling Guan (丘穆陵觀), and Qiudun Dui (丘敦堆) to serve as the Crown Prince's advisor. From this point on, most matters, particularly domestic matters, were ruled on by Crown Prince Tao, while Emperor Mingyuan himself only ruled on important matters.

Later in 422, after hearing about the death of Liu Yu (who had seized the Jin throne in 420 and established Liu Song), Emperor Mingyuan broke off relations with Liu Song and called his council, informing the advisors that he planned to attack and seize three major cities south of the Yellow River from Liu Song—Luoyang, Hulao, and Huatai, despite Cui's opposition.  He commissioned Daxi as the commander of the forced to attack Liu Song.

Daxi first put Huatai under siege, but after he was unable to capture it quickly, Emperor Mingyuan personally led an army south to aid Daxi. He also had Crown Prince Tao lead an army to the northern border, to guard against a Rouran attack. Huatai then fell, and Daxi then approached Hulao and Luoyang. Meanwhile, Emperor Mingyuan also sent the generals E Qing (娥清), Lü Dafei (閭大肥), Pu Ji (普幾), and Yizhan Jian (乙旃建) east, capturing several commanderies in modern western Shandong. However, while other cities in Song's Qing Province (青州, modern central and eastern Shandong) fell as well, the Northern Wei forces were unable to capture the capital of Qing Province, Dongyang (東陽, in modern Qingzhou, Shandong), and were eventually forced to withdraw after food supplies ran out and a large number of soldiers grew ill.  Northern Wei forces also stalled in their siege of Hulao, defended by the capable Liu Song general Mao Dezu (毛德祖), but were meanwhile able to capture Luoyang and Xuchang (許昌, in modern Xuchang, Henan) in spring 423, cutting off the path of any Liu Song relief force for Hulao. In summer 423, Hulao fell. The campaign then ceased, with Northern Wei now in control of much of modern Henan and western Shandong.

In 423, Emperor Mingyuan also started a major building project—the building of a wall on the northern borders to defend against Rouran attacks.

In winter 423, Emperor Mingyuan died from Chinese alchemical elixir poisoning. Crown Prince Tao took the throne as Emperor Taiwu.

Family
Consorts and Issue:
 Empress Zhao'ai, of the Yao clan (d. 420)
 Empress Mi, of the Du clan (d. 420)
 Tuoba Dao, Emperor Taiwu (408–452), first son
 Furen, of the Murong clan
 Tuoba Pi, Prince Lepingli (d. 444), second son
 Furen, of the Murong clan
 Tuoba Fan, Prince Le'anxuan (d. 444), fourth son
 Furen, of the Yin clan
 Tuoba Jian, Prince Yongchangzhuang (d. 441), fifth son
 Unknown
 Tuoba Mi, Prince Andingshang (d. 424)
 Tuoba Chong, Prince Jianningjing (d. 453)
 Tuoba Jun, Duke Xinxing (d. 441)
 Princess Wuwei
 Married Juqu Mujian, Prince Hexi (d. 447) in 437, and had issue (two daughters)
 Married Li Gai, Duke Nan in 447
 Princess Shiping
 Married Helian Chang, Prince Qin (d. 434) in 428
 Princess Longxi
 Married Yao Hedou

Ancestry

References

 Book of Wei, vol. 3.
 History of the Northern Dynasties, vol. 1.
 Zizhi Tongjian, vols. 113, 115, 116, 117, 118, 119.

|- style="text-align: center;"

|-

|- style="text-align: center;"

Northern Wei emperors
392 births
423 deaths
5th-century Chinese monarchs
People from Hohhot